Brahmanbaria is a city of Bangladesh and the capital of Brahmanbaria Sadar Upazila as well as Brahmanbaria District. It is the second largest city after Cumilla in eastern Bangladesh and one of the oldest municipalities in Bangladesh, established in 1868. 
Brahmanbaria was declared a district headquarters in 1984. Its municipality area has a population of 270,000 in 2020. It is the 17th largest city in Bangladesh.

History

During the Indo-Pakistan War of 1971 for the liberation of Bangladesh, when Pakistan Army planners predicted India would launch its main attack in the east along the Akhaura–Brahmanbaria axis, it had no brigades available to cover this area, and Pakistan Army moved its 27th brigade from Mymensingh to Akhaura after retaining two battalions of 27th brigade at Mymensingh to form the 93rd Brigade to defend Mymensingh. Pakistan Army's 93,000 troops unconditionally surrendered to the Indian Army and India's local ally Mukti Bahini on 16 December 1971. This day and event is commemorated as the Bijoy Dibos in Bangladesh and Vijay Diwas in India.

Administration 
Brahmanbaria was given city status in 1984. Brahmanbaria Municipality is subdivided into 20 wards.

Geography and climate 

Brahmanbaria is located in the East-Central region of Bangladesh. Its nearby cities are Dhaka, Cumilla, Narayanganj and Agartala. This city is in the bank of Titas River. Also there is Meghna River in the west of Brahmanbaria.

Brahmanbaria has a tropical wet and dry climate.

Notable residents 
Syed Abdul Hadi is from  Brahmanbaria ,is a Bangladeshi musician. He won the National Film Award five times . In 2000, he was awarded the Ekushey Padak , the second highest civilian honor of Bangladesh, for his contribution to music . Brahmanbaria also produced actresses like Zakia Bari Momo, who won LUX Channel I Superstar, Tasnova Hoque Elvin. Alamgir is evergreen actor of Cinema of Bangladesh. He start working in mid '80s and he is still an actor. Brahmanbaria has other people like Al Mahmud, Cricketer Mohammad Ashraful, Abdul Kadir and Syed Shamsul Haque who are poets. Nawaab Syed Shamsul Huda was a leader of the Muslim League. Ali Azam (politician) was a leader of Awami League. Shakil Ahmed was the director general of border guards, who had heavily secured the borders of Bangladesh.

Gallery

See also 
 Economy of Brahmanbaria
 List of colleges and universities in Brahmanbaria
 Tourism in Brahmanbaria
 Chhanamukhi

Destinations

References

External links 

Populated places in Chittagong Division
Cities in Bangladesh
Brahmanbaria